Scalopodontes is an extinct genus of therocephalian which existed in Russia during the Late Permian period. The type species is Scalopodontes kotelnichi. Fossils have been found in the Sokolki Assemblage Zone of the Urpalov Formation.

References 

Ictidosuchids
Therocephalia genera
Lopingian synapsids of Europe
Fossils of Russia
Fossil taxa described in 2000